Yevhen Tkachuk (born 27 June 1991) is a professional Ukrainian football defender who plays for Metalist 1925 Kharkiv.

Career

Club
Tkachuk is the product of FC Metalurh Zaporizhia Youth Sportive School.

On 24 February 2017, Tkachuk signed for FC Irtysh Pavlodar, leaving the club on 5 June 2017 by mutual consent.

On 26 January 2018, Tkachuk returned to Kazakhstan, signing for FC Shakhter Karagandy.

International
Tkachuk was called up to the Ukraine national under-21 football team for matches in the Valeri Lobanovsky Memorial Tournament in 9–10 August 2011.

References

External links
 
 

1991 births
Living people
Ukrainian footballers
FC Shakhtar-3 Donetsk players
FC Vorskla Poltava players
Ukrainian Premier League players
Ukrainian First League players
Ukrainian Second League players
FC Zorya Luhansk players
Association football defenders
FC Irtysh Pavlodar players
FC Stal Kamianske players
FC Shakhter Karagandy players
FC Metalist 1925 Kharkiv players
Ukrainian expatriate footballers
Expatriate footballers in Kazakhstan
Ukrainian expatriate sportspeople in Kazakhstan